Megachile dacica is a species of bee in the family Megachilidae. It was described by Mocsáry in 1879.

References

Dacica
Insects described in 1879